Chelmen Sang-e Sofla (also Romanized as Chelmen Sang-e Soflá; also known as Chelmen Sang-e Pā’īn, Chelmeh Sang-e Soflá, and Cholmeh Sang) is a village in Abravan Rural District, Razaviyeh District, Mashhad County, Razavi Khorasan Province, Iran. At the 2006 census, its population was 857, in 175 families.

References 

Populated places in Mashhad County